Kawanaphila is a genus of insects in family Tettigoniidae (bush crickets or katydids) from Australia. It was described in 1993 by David C. Rentz.

Species
Kawanaphila contains the following species:
 Kawanaphila gidya Rentz, 1993
 Kawanaphila goolwa Rentz, 1993
 Kawanaphila iyouta Rentz, 1993
 Kawanaphila lexceni Rentz, 1993
 Kawanaphila mirla Rentz, 1993
 Kawanaphila nartee Rentz, 1993 - type species
 Kawanaphila pachomai Rentz, 1993 (Endangered)
 Kawanaphila pillara Rentz, 1993
 Kawanaphila triodiae Rentz, 1993
 Kawanaphila ungarunya Rentz, 1993
 Kawanaphila yarraga Rentz, 1993

References

Tettigoniidae
Tettigoniidae genera
Taxonomy articles created by Polbot